The Nymphus Hinckley House is a historic house located in the Osterville village of Barnstable, Massachusetts.

Description and history 
The -story Cape cottage was built c. 1780, and is a well-preserved Federal style structure on a property that also has a period barn. Located just outside Osterville village, it is five bays wide, and has a centered entry with a five-pane transom window. The windows and entry butt directly against the eaves. The house was built by Nymphus Hinckley, a veteran of the American Revolutionary War.

The house was listed on the National Register of Historic Places on March 13, 1987.

See also
National Register of Historic Places listings in Barnstable County, Massachusetts

References

External links
 MACRIS Listing - Gideon Hawley House

Houses in Barnstable, Massachusetts
National Register of Historic Places in Barnstable, Massachusetts
Houses on the National Register of Historic Places in Barnstable County, Massachusetts
Federal architecture in Massachusetts
Houses completed in 1780